Paul Gregory Cormack (born 15 April 1962) is a former English cricketer.  Cormack was a right-handed batsman who occasionally bowled off spin.  He was born in Blyth, Northumberland.

Cormack made his debut for Northumberland in the 1985 MCCA Knockout Trophy against Lincolnshire.  Cormack played Minor counties cricket for Northumberland from 1985 to 1993, which included 31 Minor Counties Championship appearances and 7 MCCA Knockout Trophy matches.  He made his List A debut against Essex in the 1986 NatWest Trophy.  He made 2 further List A appearances, against Essex in the 1987 NatWest Trophy and Surrey in the 1989 NatWest Trophy.  In his 3 List A matches, he scored 53 runs at an average of 17.66, with a high score of 36.

References

External links
Paul Cormack at ESPNcricinfo
Paul Cormack at CricketArchive

1962 births
Living people
People from Blyth, Northumberland
Cricketers from Northumberland
English cricketers
Northumberland cricketers